The Manuel Rivera-Ortiz Foundation for Documentary Photography & Film is a non-profit private operating foundation headquartered in Rochester, New York. The foundation was established in 2010 by documentary photographer Manuel Rivera-Ortiz to support underrepresented photographers and filmmakers from less developed countries with grants, awards, exhibitions, and educational programs.

Photography grant winners
 2011 Mads Nissen 
 2012 Gustavo Jononovich
 2013 Vivek Singh
 2014 Mohamed Ali Eddin
 2015 Pablo Ernesto Piovano
 2016 : Enri Canaj and Ismail Ferdous

Photography prize winners
 2014 Camille Lepage
 2015 Lucien Clergue
 2015 Mo Yi

Film prize winners
 2013 Kannan Arunasalam
 2014 Alfonso Moral
 2015 Laurence Bonvin

Exhibitions
2013 Rencontres d'Arles, Arles, France.
2013 Ikono Gallery, Brussels, Belgium.
2014 Rencontres d'Arles, Arles, France.
2015 Rencontres d'Arles, Arles, France.
2016 Rencontres d'Arles, Arles, France.
2022 Dress Code, Rencontres d'Arles, Arles, France.

Publications
A New Documentary, The Manuel Rivera-Ortiz Foundation for Documentary Photography & Film, New York 2013. .
Dress Code, Kehrer Verlag, Heidelberg 2022. .

References

External links
 The Manuel Rivera-Ortiz Foundation for Documentary Photography & Film Official Website
 Manuel Rivera-Ortiz-Foundation's founder and president speaks of grant's aims and importance
 Manuel Rivera-Ortiz Official Website (with image galleries)
 Thoughts on Photography with Paul Giguere Interview with Manuel Rivera-Ortiz, July 23, 2009
Inside Philanthropy

Documentary film organizations
Photography foundations
International cultural organizations
American photography organizations
International organizations based in the United States
Organizations established in 2010
2010 establishments in New York (state)
Non-profit organizations based in New York (state)
501(c)(3) organizations